The 1920 New Hampshire gubernatorial election was held on November 2, 1920. Republican nominee Albert O. Brown defeated Democratic nominee Charles E. Tilton with 59.59% of the vote.

General election

Candidates
Major party candidates
Albert O. Brown, Republican
Charles E. Tilton, Democratic

Other candidates
Frank T. Butler, Socialist

Results

References

1920
New Hampshire
Gubernatorial